Cease the Day is the fifth full-length studio album by the Norwegian progressive metal band In the Woods... It is their first album without the Botteri brothers, guitarist Christian "X" and bassist Christopher "C:M.".

Track listing

References

2018 albums
In the Woods... albums